The 2004 Tour Down Under, known as Jacob's Creek Tour Down Under for sponsorship reasons, was the sixth edition of the Tour Down Under stage race. It took place from 20 January to 25 January  in and around Adelaide, South Australia and was the first major stage race of the season. The race was won by Patrick Jonker, who rode for Team UniSA.

Stages

Stage 1
20 January 2004 – Adelaide - Adelaide,  

Stage and General Classification after Stage 1

Stage 2
21 January 2004 – Norwood to Kapunda,

Final standings

General classification

Points Classification

King of the Mountains classification

Young Riders' classification

References

Tour Down Under
Tour Down Under
Tour Down Under
2004 in Oceanian sport
Tour